Yuri Barseghov (March 7, 1925 in Tiflis – August 6, 2008 in Moscow) was an international law expert, J.D., professor, member of the United Nations' International Law Commission, the special assistant of the UN Deputy Secretary-General at the UN Secretariat (since 1971), director of the Armenian Institute of International Law and Political Science and a Foreign Member of the Armenian Academy of Sciences.

His most famous work was a three-volume collection of documents titled "The Armenian Genocide: Turkish responsibility and obligations of the international community. Documents and Comments" was published in 2005. This year he also published the first volume of his collected papers on Nagorno-Karabakh. He was an author of over 300 articles on international relations and law published in Russia, France, Germany, Norway, Sweden, Japan, Finland, Armenia and United States.

Barseghov was also a member of the Maritime Law Association and the International Law Association of Russia.

References

External links
Professor Yuri Barseghov Dies, Noyan Tapan, Aug 8, 2008

20th-century Russian lawyers
Soviet Armenians
Russian people of Armenian descent
1925 births
2008 deaths
People from Tbilisi 
International Law Commission officials
Burials in Troyekurovskoye Cemetery
Soviet officials of the United Nations
Members of the International Law Commission